Laëtitia Le Corguillé (born 29 July 1986 in Saint-Brieuc) is a French BMX racer and Olympic athlete who won the silver medal in BMX at the 2008 Beijing Olympic Games.

She began to cycle BMX bikes in 1991, following the example of her older brother Emeric Le Corguillé. In 2005, Le Courguillé joined the division of France BMX located in Aix-en-Provence to participate in an intensive training programme in advance of the 2008 Olympic Games. At the 2008 Games, the first time for BMX to be an Olympic sport, she took the silver medal behind her compatriot Anne-Caroline Chausson and ahead of British woman Shanaze Reade. At the 2012 Olympic Games, she finished fourth in the final.

References

External links

 
 
 
 
 
 
 

1986 births
Living people
BMX riders
French female cyclists
Olympic cyclists of France
Olympic silver medalists for France
Olympic medalists in cycling
Cyclists at the 2008 Summer Olympics
Cyclists at the 2012 Summer Olympics
Medalists at the 2008 Summer Olympics
UCI BMX World Champions (elite women)
Rennes 2 University alumni
Cyclists from Brittany
Sportspeople from Saint-Brieuc